Andrico Hines (born December 10, 1980) is a former American football quarterback who played three seasons in the Arena Football League (AFL) with the Cleveland Gladiators and Pittsburgh Power. He first enrolled at Middle Georgia College before transferring to Southwest Mississippi Community College and then Middle Tennessee State University. He attended Riverdale High School in Riverdale, Georgia. Hines was also a member of the South Georgia Wildcats, Chattahoochee Valley Vipers, Spokane Shock, Bossier–Shreveport Battle Wings and Alabama Vipers.

Early years
Hines played high school football for the Riverdale High School Raiders and was a four-year starter at quarterback. He helped the Raiders to a 13–1 record as a senior and a berth in the semifinals of the state playoffs. He was also named all-State, all-County and all-Region his senior year. Hines set a state record with five touchdowns in a state playoff game.

College career
Hines first played college football for the Middle Georgia Warriors of Middle Georgia College. He transferred to play for the Southwest Mississippi Bears of Southwest Mississippi Community College. He was named to the Mississippi JUCO All-Star team in 2000. Hines completed 101 of 158 pass attempts for 1,319 yards for 15 touchdowns and four interceptions. He transferred to play for the Middle Tennessee Blue Raiders of Middle Tennessee State University from 2002 to 2003. He recorded 13 touchdowns on 3,495 passing yards for the Blue Raiders.

Professional career
Hines played for the South Georgia Wildcats of the af2 during the 2005 season. He played for the Chattahoochee Valley Vipers of the American Indoor Football League during the 2006 season. He tore his ACL in the third game of the 2006 season. Hines played for the Spokane Shock of the af2 in 2007. He helped the Shock to the playoffs, completing 64% of his passes for over 2,800 yards while recording 62 touchdowns and 8 interceptions. He played for the South Georgia Wildcats in 2008, recording 67 touchdown passes as the Wildcats won the AF2 south division title. Hines played for the af2's Bossier–Shreveport Battle Wings in 2009, recording 76 touchdowns and 11 interceptions on 3,214 passing yards. He was assigned to the Alabama Vipers of the AFL on November 30, 2009. He left the Vipers on June 15, 2010 after refusing to report and being suspended by the team. Hines signed with the Albany Panthers of the Southern Indoor Football League following his suspension from the Vipers. He was assigned to the AFL's Cleveland Gladiators on June 2, 2011. He completed 8 of 15 passes for 102 yards and two touchdowns as an AFL rookie for the Gladiators. Hines was assigned to the Pittsburgh Power of the AFL on January 30, 2012. He completed 134 of 224 passes for 1,640 yards and 30 touchdowns with seven interceptions for the Power in 2012. He signed with the Cleveland Gladiators on May 30, 2013. Hines appeared in one game for the Gladiators. He was reassigned by the team on June 4, 2013.

References

External links
Just Sports Stats
College stats

1980 births
Living people
People from Riverdale, Georgia
Sportspeople from the Atlanta metropolitan area
Players of American football from Georgia (U.S. state)
African-American players of American football
American football quarterbacks
Middle Georgia Warriors football players
Southwest Mississippi Bears football players
Middle Tennessee Blue Raiders football players
South Georgia Wildcats players
Spokane Shock players
Bossier–Shreveport Battle Wings players
Alabama Vipers players
Albany Panthers players
Cleveland Gladiators players
Pittsburgh Power players
21st-century African-American sportspeople
20th-century African-American people